Martin Weise (12 May 1903 in Torgau; 15 November 1943 in Brandenburg-Görden Prison) was a German journalist, member of the Communist Party of Germany (KPD) and a resistance fighter against the Nazis during World War II. From 1929 to 1934, Weiss published the socialist Die Rote Fahne newspaper. He was arrested and sent to a concentration camp until 1939. When he was released, he decided to resist and made contact with  Wilhelm Guddorf and the Hamburg based group around Bernhard Bästlein and Robert Abshagen He became associated with an anti-fascist resistance group that was run by Harro Schulze-Boysen and Arvid Harnack, that was later called the Red Orchestra by the Abwehr.

Life
Wiese was the son of a teacher.

Weise began studying history and philosophy in 1922. However, he had to abandon his studies in 1924 for financial reasons. Before becoming unemployed in 1928, Weise worked for a few years as a clerk in an insurance company. From 1929 to 1933 he was a district councillor for the KPD in Neukölln in Bertlin. From 1930, he wrote articles for the central organ of the KPD, Die Rote Fahne. Weise was one of the editors who continued to publish this newspaper illegally after the Nazis Seizure of control in 1933.

On 5 April 1934, he was sentenced by the Berlin Court of Appeal, to three years in prison, which he spent in the Brandenburg prison. He learned that his fiancée Baroness , who had worked as a courier for the KPD, had committed suicide in prison on 27 May 1936, after succumbing to Gestapo abuse while in custody. After his release from prison in 1937, he was transferred to Sachsenhausen concentration camp. After his release from the concentration camp in April 1939, Weise re-established contact with his friends, including Wilhelm Guddorf. Weise and Guddorf established links with the Hamburg communists, Bernhard Bästlein and Robert Abshagen. Together they collaborated on the pamphlet "Organised the Revolutionary Mass Struggle" (Organisiert den revolutionären Massenkampf). Together with John Sieg, Fritz Lange and Walter Husemann, Weise regularly distributed the underground journal Die innere Front (The Inner Front) in Berlin from the end of 1941, which contained appeals, information about the general situation and references to the broadcast frequencies of Moscow radio.

Weise was arrested in December 1942. On 8 October 1943 the 2nd Senate of the People's Court condemned him to death because of "preparation for high treason and because of enemy favouritism". Weise was executed by beheading in Brandenburg prison on 15 November 1943.

Bibliography

References

1903 births
1943 deaths
Red Orchestra (espionage)
People from Torgau
German communists
German resistance members
Executed communists in the German Resistance
German journalists
People executed by Nazi Germany by guillotine